Helicops leopardinus, the  leopard keelback, is a species of snake in the family Colubridae. It is found in South America.

References 

Helicops]
Snakes of South America
Reptiles of Bolivia
Reptiles of Brazil
Reptiles of Colombia
Reptiles of Ecuador
Reptiles of Peru
Reptiles of Paraguay
Reptiles described in 1837
Taxa named by Hermann Schlegel